John O'Reilly (November 25, 1940 –) is an American composer and author of several successful instruction books. He has received numerous ASCAP awards and studied composition with Robert Washburn (composer), Arthur Frackenpohl, Charles Walton and Donald Hunsberger. He graduated from the Crane School of Music at the State University of New York at Potsdam.  In addition, he is the recipient of a Master of Arts in Composition and Theory degree from Columbia University and an honorary Doctorate of Music Education from Crane. He taught instrumental music and theory at all levels and for 35 years was Editor-In-Chief and Executive Vice President for Alfred Publishing Company. He is co-author of Yamaha Band Student with Sandy Feldstein, Strictly Strings, and Accent on Achievement with Mark Williams. He has made a major impact on concert band, and string music education. He has received numerous commissions, published 380 compositions and has conducted ensembles in 48 states, all Canadian provinces and numerous international venues. In 2014 he received an Honorary Doctor of Music degree from the State University of New York Crane School of Music. Some songs John O'Reilly has created in the book Accent on Achievement are "Eagle Summit March" And "Galactic Episode." O'Reilly graduated from the Crane School of Music, State University of New York at Potsdam. In addition, he is the recipient of a Masters of Arts in composition and theory from Columbia University. His years of teaching experience at elementary through college levels has provided him with insights and sensitivities to the needs of both student and educators.

Compositions for Band

Books

References

http://www.alfred.com/Company/Authors/JohnOReilly.aspx
https://www.hebu-music.com/en/musician/john-oreilly.182/

External links
John O'Reilly NAMM Oral History Program Interview (2014)

1940 births
Living people
Crane School of Music alumni
Columbia University School of the Arts alumni